Minerva Project is an educational organization that designs and delivers educational programs through educational and corporate partners globally. Its mission is reforming education through an interdisciplinary curriculum and fully active learning pedagogy delivered on a proprietary learning environment called ForumTM.

History 
Minerva Project was founded by CEO and Chairman Ben Nelson in 2011 and received a $25 million seed investment from Benchmark Capital in 2012. In 2013, Minerva Project announced a partnership with Keck Graduate Institute to form the Minerva Schools at KGI, effectively becoming its first partner. Since then, more than 20 institutions, including high schools, universities, and corporations around the world, use the Minerva educational methodology to deliver their educational programs. The full methodology is described and documented in a book published by the MIT Press.

Philosophy 
There is still some debate on what the purpose of higher education is, with one view arguing that higher education is solely for preparing graduates for specific careers, and others that education is the pursuit of knowledge and wisdom for their own sake.

Minerva Project supports a view proposed by Benjamin Franklin and Thomas Jefferson more than two centuries ago. Their view advocates usefulness or “practical” knowledge; knowledge acquired to serve the country and humankind. This is why Minerva Project offers education centered around teaching students concepts and skills that nurture better decision-making in their professional, civic and personal lives.

Educational approach 

Minerva's educational approach is centered on three pillars, developed based on decades of research on the science of learning: an interdisciplinary curriculum; fully active learning pedagogy; and outcomes-based assessment. Minerva's proprietary virtual learning environment, Forum, is designed to facilitate these three components. The approach has been lauded as a potential model for the future of higher education, particularly during the COVID-19 pandemic.

The interdisciplinary curriculum is structured to introduce transferrable skills such as critical thinking and problem-solving, then reinforce them over time, through practical application across multiple courses and contexts. The curriculum gives learners the tools to think systematically and approach problems critically and creatively.

The fully active learning pedagogy is a set of instructional practices that maximizes learner engagement, supported by functionalities of Forum such as Talk Time. Rather than the traditional focus on lectures and information dissemination, Fully Active Learning promotes a deeper grasp of the concepts being taught. Classes are constructed using a range of collaborative activities, including Socratic discussion, live polling, breakout groups, debate, role-playing, and simulations, among others. Instructors guide each session, emphasizing learner participation, group discourse, and project-based applications.

The feedback and assessment system is based on the learner's performance on learning outcomes that appear in multiple courses and disciplines. Learners receive feedback on their class participation, in-class assignments, and out-of-class assignments, and are able to track their progress on learning outcomes over time.

Educational partners 
 North and Central America:
 American School of Santo Domingo (Dominican Republic)
 Barna Business School (Dominican Republic)
 UC Berkeley School of Law (U.S.)
 Davidson College (U.S.)
 Global Citizen Year (U.S.)
 USC Marshall School of Business (U.S.)
 Minerva University (U.S.)
 Paul Quinn College (U.S.)
 Stanza International Academy (U.S.)
 University of Miami (U.S.)
 Europe, Middle East and Africa
 ESADE Business School (Spain)
 IE (Spain)
 Senegalese American Bilingual School (Senegal)
 Zayed University (United Arab Emirates)
 Asia
 Apprez (Japan)
 Beyond Dream Global Leaders School (Korea)
 Elite Open Schools network (U.S. Canada, China, Korea, Indonesia, Japan)
 GIA Micro School (Korea)
 KAFA (Korea)
 KenTech (Korea)
 Kokkara (Japan)
 Singapore Intercultural School (Korea)
 Recruit (Japan)
 LG Electronics (South Korea)
 SK Group (South Korea)

References

External links 
 

Educational organizations based in the United States
2011 establishments in California
Organizations based in San Francisco